Kawa Ada (born June 12, 1980) is an Afghan-Canadian actor, writer and producer. He distinguished himself as a stage actor on Broadway and in Toronto before pursuing a career as a film and television actor and a writer. He is also a dancer, a choreographer, a keynote speaker and a voice actor, most recently known for playing Razaq in The Breadwinner.

Early life
Ada was born on June 12, 1980, in Kabul, Afghanistan, in a Dari-speaking family belonging to the Pashtun aristocracy. His father was a famous national chess champion. In the midst of the Soviet–Afghan War, when Ada was but a young child, his family was forced to flee the country. They entered Pakistan as refugees, from where they emigrated to India. His sister Blanesta Ada was then born on May 17, 1983.  Growing up there, Ada dreamed of becoming a Bollywood movie star. The family then illegally moved to Switzerland, where his father was arrested and detained. When Ada was 8 years old, his family finally emigrated to Canada, where they settled in Toronto. In school, he was recognized as a studious and bright kid who was very much involved in student life, and has described his high-school self as a nerd.

Ada pursued his higher education in the United-States, where he graduated as valedictorian from the Boston Conservatory with a BFA in Theatre.

Career
After graduating from the Boston Conservatory, Ada was immediately cast on Broadway in Bombay Dreams. He then perfected his Shakespearean skills with the Publick Theatre in plays such as Troilus and Cressida. In parallel to this work, Ada came up with an original text based on his personal experiences during the Soviet invasion of his home-country, his difficult journey to relocate and integrate into Western culture and the hurdles of being an Afghan in America following the September 11 attacks. This piece, The Canny Afghani, premiered at the Boston Center for the Arts in 2004 as Ada's first one-man show. He would explain that:

Back in Canada, Ada made a name for himself during three seasons of the Shaw Festival, along with parts in productions of The Grand, Canadian Stage and Cahoots Theatre. His performances were appreciated and earned him The Shaw Festival Outstanding Newcomer award in 2007 and the Stage West – Equity Emerging Theatre Artist Award the next year. His subsequent role in Paper SERIES drew further attention and earned him a nomination for a Dora Award. After that, he was cast as a lead in My Granny the Goldfish, after which he was consistently given leading parts. Eventually, he would even be established enough as an actor that he did not have to audition anymore.

In 2014, Ada wrote his second play, The Wanderers, which combines comedy, kinky sex, suicide, ghosts, hysteria, nudity and religious imagery, on the backdrop of an otherwise timeless tale of father-son conflict. Although the production of the play by Cahoots Theatre garnered mixed reviews, the depth and richness of the text would soon be rehabilitated and go on to be studied in universities. The same year, Ada released his first short film, Jihad Gigolo, which he wrote, produced and starred in: the story of a young man who makes ends meet by dressing up as a "terrorist call boy" to fulfill the weird fantasies of his clients, until his girlfriend and the Secret Service find out. The movie premiered at the ReelWorld Film Festival where it was received well.

The next year, Ada was highly praised for his part in Accidental Death of an Anarchist. Theatre critic Amanda Campbell declared that "Kawa Ada, as the Madman, is a breathtaking tour de force, bursting with energy and words and playful shenanigans that cascade out of him with breakneck speed and formidable urgency.", while Robert Crew of The Star wrote: "Kawa Ada is a marvel in the role. He swaggers, skips, hops into someone’s lap, overacts to the hilt, mugs and wows the audiences with a smile that could melt a Newfoundland iceberg." The performance earned him a Dora award, and he was named NOW Magazine's Toronto's Best Male Actor. This success was immediately followed, the same year, by another noted performance in Bombay Black. In this play, Ada was cast as Aspara, a young female dancer who makes a living by dancing for men in private. At first, he was reticent to "take away" a role written for a woman, but he was convinced to take on the challenge as an opportunity to question gender in a patriarchal society. He choreographed himself the dances, which were deemed "enchanting" and "impossibly ethereal". The hard work that went into Ada's interpretation of Aspara was praised, eventually earning him the Toronto Theatre Critics Award for Best Male Actor of the Year. In a radio interview, he explained his artistic approach thusly:

In December 2016, Ada suffered a leg fracture, which kept him off-stage for some time and put a definitive end to his dancing career. Nevertheless, his work as a playwright and director continued, and in January 2017 he presented The Death of Mrs. Gandhi and the Beginning of New Physics (A Political Fantasy). In this satiric fusion of feminism and politics, four powerful women – Margaret Thatcher, Imelda Marcos, Benazir Bhutto and Kim Campbell – gather for Indira Gandhi's funeral, but are hijacked by a time-travelling terrorist.

In 2017, Ada lent his voice to Razaq in the animated feature film The Breadwinner, based on the best-selling novel by Deborah Ellis, which had its world premiere at the 2017 Toronto International Film Festival. In addition to his voice performance, Ada was a dialect and accent coach to his fellow actors on set.

As of 2018, Ada is a playwright in residence at Tarragon Theatre, where he is working on his next play, Finding Islam, the story of a mother investigating the disappearance of her son, who is suspected to have joined ISIS. During this time he has also taught as an acting professor at the George Brown Theatre School.

Other careers 

In parallel to his stage career, Ada has also worked in higher education administration. He has notably worked in the department of Student Community and Leadership Development at York University. As of 2019, he was working at the Student Housing and Hospitality Services at the University of British Columbia, first as a Residence Life Manager, before being promoted to Associate Director. As part of this position, he notably launched a podcast on leadership, titled "Are you being served?"

Ada is also a national keynote speaker on issues of diversity, inclusion and motivation. This work as a promoteur of values of diversity and empowerment has also influenced his approach to acting. When talking about the production of David French's famously Newfoundland-rooted play Salt-Water Moon with actors that were not typical Newfoundlanders, Ada explained:

Similarly, in a group interview following the presentation of The Breadwinner at the Toronto International Film Festival, Ada stressed the political importance of the film:

Personal life 
Ada is fluent is Dari and English, and also knows Hindi and French. Ada identifies as queer.

He is a Trekkie, especially fond of Star Trek: The Next Generation, and used to collect unopened Star Trek figurines.

His goddaughter is also an actress. He met her at Factory Theatre, where Ada has been a mentor to younger actors, and the two of them would eventually star together in A Christmas Carol.

Filmography, stage and other works

Film

Television

Writing

Theatre

Awards 

|-
| style="text-align:center;"| 2019
| rowspan="1" style="text-align:center;"| Kiss of the Spider Woman
| Dora Mavor Moore Award for Outstanding Performance in a Leading Role
|
|-
| style="text-align:center;"| 2016
| rowspan="1" style="text-align:center;"| Bombay Black
| Toronto Theatre Critics Award – Best Male Actor of the Year
|
|-
| style="text-align:center;"| 2015
| rowspan="1" style="text-align:center;"| Kawa Ada
| NOW Magazine's Toronto's Best Male Actor
|
|-
| style="text-align:center;"| 2015
| rowspan="1" style="text-align:center;"| Accidental Death of an Anarchist
| Dora Mavor Moore Award for Outstanding Male Performance
|
|-
| style="text-align:center;"| 2014
| rowspan="1" style="text-align:center;"| The Wanderers
| Broadway World Toronto Award for Best Leading Actor
|
|-
| style="text-align:center;"| 2013
| rowspan="1" style="text-align:center;"| Iceland
| Broadway World Awards for Best Leading Actor
|
|-
| style="text-align:center;"| 2013
| rowspan="1" style="text-align:center;"| Kawa Ada
| NOW Magazine's Toronto's Best Male Actor
|
|-
| style="text-align:center;"| 2012
| rowspan="1" style="text-align:center;"| My Granny The Goldfish
| National Post – Robert Cushman's Year's Best Performances
|
|-
| style="text-align:center;"| 2011
| rowspan="1" style="text-align:center;"| Paper Series
| Dora Mavor Moore Award for Outstanding Featured Performer/Ensemble
|
|-
| style="text-align:center;"| 2008
| rowspan="1" style="text-align:center;"| Kawa Ada
| Stage West – Equity Emerging Theatre Artist Award
|
|-
| style="text-align:center;"| 2007
| rowspan="1" style="text-align:center;"| Kawa Ada
| Saunderson Award – The Shaw Festival Outstanding Newcomer
|

References

External links
 

Living people
Canadian male musical theatre actors
Canadian male Shakespearean actors
Canadian people of Afghan descent
Male actors from Toronto
Canadian male television actors
21st-century Canadian male actors
Afghan emigrants to Canada
Canadian male voice actors
People from Kabul
Canadian male film actors
Canadian male dramatists and playwrights
21st-century Canadian dramatists and playwrights
1982 births
Queer men
Canadian LGBT actors
Canadian LGBT dramatists and playwrights
Queer dramatists and playwrights
21st-century Canadian LGBT people